Pierre Serna (born September 28, 1963) is a French historian, specialist in the French Revolution. He is currently a university professor at University of Paris 1 Pantheon-Sorbonne, and a member of the Institute for the History of the French Revolution (UMS 622 / CNRS) which he directed from 2008 to 2015 before his integration into the Institut d modern and contemporary history (IHMC).

Biography 
Former student of the Lycée Masséna in Nice, where he follows the history lessons of Emile Llorca, Pierre Serna continues his studies in Paris at the Lycée Henri-IV and at the Lycée Lakanal, then at the University of Paris 1 Pantheon-Sorbonne, from 1984. He then began his first research work under the direction of Michel Vovelle, successor two years previously of Albert Soboul. He obtained the aggregation of history in 1986 and taught successively at the Lycée Faidherbe in Lille, at the Lycée international de Saint-Germain-en-Laye, then at the University of Catania in Sicily, as a reader / linguistic attaché for services events of the French Embassy in Italy.

He devoted his doctoral thesis to an unrecognized revolutionary aristocrat, Pierre-Antoine Antonelle. In 1998, following the publication of this thesis, he obtained the grand history prize of the General Council of Bouches-du-Rhône, awarded by a jury chaired by historians Maurice Agulhon and Robert-Henri Bautier.

He was a lecturer in modern history at the University of Reims Champagne-Ardenne from 1995 to 1998, before being appointed to Paris I at the start of the 1999 academic year. In 2008, he became a university professor and took charge of the 'Institute for the History of the French Revolution, tenth professor since Alphonse Aulard and seventh director since its foundation by Georges Lefebvre and Jean Zay in 1937. He held this position from 2008 to 2015, the date of his integration into the Institut d modern and contemporary history (IHMC).

Since October 1, 2019, he has been a member of the Institut Universitaire de France.

He runs the electronic review La Révolution française.

He has been vice-president of the International Commission for the History of the French Revolution since 2010.

He is also scientific director of the digitization of the Parliamentary Archives in collaboration with Persée, Bibliothèque de la Sorbonne) and the Institut d'histoire de la Révolution française.

After having devoted twenty years of research to the elites in the revolutionary process, he now works on the humble in revolution.

Political and editorial commitments 
He was a member of the Comité de vigilance face aux usages publics de l'histoire, he is engaged in this capacity and as scientific manager of the Institut d'histoire de la Révolution française, in the reflection on the ways of teaching the Revolution and the uses of that - in contemporary public space, and especially in political discourse.

In early 2011, he published several texts on the Tunisian Revolution and the Egyptian revolution of 2011. He criticizes in particular the analyzes made by certain historians in parallel with the events of 1789, in the columns of the newspaper Le Monde.

In 2015, he signed a text published in Le Monde which protested against “lies and fantasies” relayed in opinion by the media about the new history programs in college.

In 2017, he co-signed a platform in Mediapart entitled "Faire gagner la gauche passe par le vote Mélenchon".

From May 2017, Pierre Serna ran a weekly column which appears in the Friday edition of l'Humanité.

Notes and References 

1963 births
Living people
20th-century French historians
Historians of the French Revolution
21st-century French historians